Tell the Truth is the fourth posthumous studio album by Otis Redding (his tenth studio album overall), featuring songs recorded in 1967.

Track listing

Personnel
Credits adapted from rateyourmusic.com.

 Otis Redding - vocals
 Booker T. Jones, Isaac Hayes - keyboards, organ, piano
 Steve Cropper - guitar, producer, liner notes
 Donald Dunn - bass guitar
 Al Jackson Jr. - drums
 Wayne Jackson - trumpet
 Andrew Love, Joe Arnold - tenor saxophone
 Jim Stewart - engineer
 Jimmy Douglass - remixer
 Jean-Pierre Leloir - photography
 Loring Eutemey - cover design

Charts

References

External links

Otis Redding albums
Compilation albums published posthumously
1970 compilation albums
Atco Records compilation albums
Albums produced by Steve Cropper